Xola Malik (formerly Stephen Spence) (born  1971), best known by his stage name Kid Sensation, is an American rapper. Born and raised in Seattle, Washington, Spence made his debut as a guest rapper featured on Sir Mix-A-Lot's album Swass, where he appeared on the track "Rippn'".

Spence has sold over one million units during his hip hop career, and has hosted hip-hop based shows such as Yo! MTV Raps and BET's Rap City.

Biography

Kid Sensation
Spence released his debut album, Rollin' With Number One, on July 2, 1990 on the Nastymix record label. Several videos were released from the album. "Prisoner of Ignorance", which goes into detail about a young man's life of crime, shows Spence rapping from an electric chair and a jail cell. Spence also released the song "Seatown Ballers" and "Skin 2 Skin" as singles from this CD.

Two years later, Spence released his follow up album The Power of Rhyme, also on Nastymix Records. A single, "The Weekend", was the only single officially released from the record. Then-Seattle Mariners outfielder, Ken Griffey Jr., performed on the track, "The Way I Swing."

In 1995, Spence left Nastymix Records and record his third album, Seatown Funk on Ichiban International. The title track was the only single released from the CD.

Xola Malik
Spence retired his Kid Sensation moniker in the mid 1990s, and was later known as Xola. He went into music production, where he produced music for Jackie Jackson of the Jackson 5, former Seattle Seahawks running back Shawn Alexander's local FSN show, and for the Seattle Mariners and Seattle Seahawks. He formed Xola Music, where he recorded ads and jingles for various professional sports teams (Green Bay Packers, San Antonio Spurs) along with some voice-over work. He recorded a track for Ken Griffey Jr. called "Back Home" in 2009. Xola also began acting in various commercials, and made his big screen debut in the movie, Safety Not Guaranteed.

Malik currently lives in Tacoma, Washington. He has re-recorded and re-released his previous Kid Sensation albums without profanity. His latest CDs are Songs for Change (2010), Seasons (2012) and Looking Up (2016); the latter containing a collaboration track with Sir Mix A Lot, titled "Love and Loyalty".

Discography

Albums

Singles
 1987 - "Square Dance Rap" / "Ripp'n" (7", Promo)
 1989 - "Back 2 Boom" / "I S.P.I.T."
 1989 - "Breakdown" / "Seatown Ballers" (12", Promo)
 1990 - "Prisoner of Ignorance" (12", Promo)
 1990 - "Seatown Ballers" (12")
 1990 - "Skin 2 Skin" (12", Promo)
 1991 - "Ride The Rhythm" (Single)
 1992 - "The Weekend" (Single) (2 versions)
 1995 - "Seatown Funk" / "Gotta Lotta Love" (12") 	
 1995 - "What Comes Around Goes Around" (12", Promo)

Certifications

References

African-American rappers
American beatboxers
Living people
Year of birth uncertain
Date of birth missing (living people)
Rappers from Seattle
21st-century American rappers
21st-century African-American musicians
Year of birth missing (living people)